is a Japanese actress.

Life and career
Momoi was born in Tokyo, Japan. At the age of 12, she traveled to London to study dance at the Royal Ballet Academy. After 3 years, she returned to Tokyo. She graduated from Japan's Bungakuza School of Dramatic Arts. In 1971, Momoi debuted in director Kon Ichikawa's Ai Futatabi (To Love Again). Her career has spanned 35 years and over 60 films.

As an actress, she has worked with directors including Akira Kurosawa (Kagemusha, 1980), Tatsumi Kumashiro (Seishun no Satetsu, 1974), Yoji Yamada (The Yellow Handkerchief, 1977 and Otoko wa Tsuraiyo, 1979), Shohei Imamura (Why Not?, 1981), Shunji Iwai (Swallowtail Butterfly, 1996), Jun Ichikawa (Tokyo Yakyoku, 1997), Mitani Koki (Welcome Back, Mr. McDonald, 1997), Yoshimitsu Morita (Like Asura, 2003) and Takashi Miike (Izo, Sukiyaki Western Django).

She performed in The Sun (2005) directed by Alexander Sokurov and appeared in director Rob Marshall's film Memoirs of a Geisha.

For her film performances in Japan, Momoi has won many awards. She has won the Japanese Academy Awards for Best Actress twice and Best Supporting Actress once and was selected Best Actress at the 1983  New York International Film Festival for her role in Giwaku (Suspicion).

Momoi has pursued various projects in producing, directing, screenwriting, and design in addition to her acting.  She has also released some 15 record albums as a singer and is an essayist.

She won the award for best actress at the 7th Hochi Film Award for Giwaku.

Filmography

Film

Television

Honours
Medal with Purple Ribbon (2008)
Kinuyo Tanaka Award (2015)
Order of the Rising Sun, 4th Class, Gold Rays with Rosette (2022)

References

External links

 
  
 
 

1951 births
Living people
Actresses from Tokyo
Recipients of the Medal with Purple Ribbon
Recipients of the Order of the Rising Sun, 4th class